Salix caroliniana, commonly known as the coastal plain willow, is a shrub or small tree native to the southeastern United States, Mexico and parts of Central America and the Caribbean. It is an obligate wetland species and grows as an emergent species in the Everglades. In the absence of fire, S. caroliniana can convert herbaceous wetlands to forested wetlands. Although fires kill large woody stems and the species does not reproduce by rhizomes or root sprouts, it sprouts readily after fire. As a result, the total number of stems does not change, but fire converts S. caroliniana from a tree into a shrub.

Salix caroliniana flowers in the early spring, either before or together with the emergence of leaves. In Alachua County, Florida in 1982, flowering was recorded during February and March.

The species was first described by French naturalist André Michaux in 1803 in his Flora Boreali-Americana.

The male flowers provide much spring pollen for bees. It is a larval host to the black-waved flannel moth, the blinded sphinx, the cecropia moth, the elm sphinx, the imperial moth, the Io moth, the modest sphinx, the mourning cloak, the polyphemus moth, the promethea moth, the red-spotted purple, and the viceroy.

References

caroliniana
Flora of the Eastern United States
Flora of the Caribbean
Flora of Central America
Flora of the Southeastern United States
Flora of Oklahoma
Flora of Texas
Taxa named by André Michaux
Plants described in 1803